The women's madison competition at the 2020 UEC European Track Championships was held on 15 November 2020.

Results
120 laps (30 km) were raced with 12 sprints.

References

Women's madison
European Track Championships – Women's madison